Channel 45 refers to several television stations:

DWVN-DTV in Manila, Philippines
SCTV (Indonesia), Indonesia on Channel 45 UHF in Jakarta territories

Canada
The following television stations broadcast on digital or analog channel 45 (UHF frequencies covering 656-662 MHz) in Canada:
 CFCN-TV-14 in Canmore, Alberta
 CIHF-TV-10 in Yarmouth, Nova Scotia
 CIVC-DT in Trois-Rivières, Quebec
 CJBR-DT in Rimouski, Quebec

The following television stations operate on virtual channel 45 in Canada:
 CIVC-DT in Trois-Rivières, Quebec
 CKES-DT in Edmonton, Alberta

Mexico
The following television stations operate on virtual channel 45 in Mexico:
 XHBJ-TDT in Tijuana, Baja California
 XHHCU-TDT in Mexico City

SPR transmitters that carry XHHCU (Canal del Congreso) place it on virtual channel 45.

See also
 Channel 45 TV stations in Mexico
 Channel 45 digital TV stations in the United States
 Channel 45 virtual TV stations in the United States
 Channel 45 low-power TV stations in the United States
 Channel 45 branded TV stations in the United States

45